Frederick Lorenzo Smith was an American football and baseball coach. He served as the head coach of the University of Illinois at Urbana–Champaign in 1900 and at Fordham University in 1901, 1904, and from 1906 to 1907, compiling a career college football record of 24–9–5.  Smith was also the head baseball coach at Fordham from 1901 to 1905, tallying a mark of 213–66.

Head coaching record

Football

References

Year of birth missing
Year of death missing
Fordham Rams baseball coaches
Fordham Rams football coaches
Illinois Fighting Illini football coaches
Princeton Tigers football players